The following is a list of characters for anime franchise, Aikatsu Friends! and their spin-off, Aikatsu on Parade! anime series.

Main characters

Pure Palette

Aine is a high school first year who belongs to Star Harmony Academy's idol division. A bright and positive girl with a kind heart, making friends is her specialty. In her second year of middle school, she formed the Friends Pure Palette with Mio Minato. Having won that year's Diamond Friends Cup, they became Diamond Friends, the apex of the Friends world. Aine serves as the muse of her own brand, Sugar Melody.

Mio is a high school first year who belongs to Star Harmony Academy's idol division. With her extraordinary fashion sense, she serves as both the designer and muse of her own brand, Material Color. Although she's a top idol who has been active since childhood, it was only after meeting Aine and forming Pure Palette did Mio fulfill her dream of becoming Diamond Friends.

Cheer Star

Mirai's "hidden child" the winner of "Mirai's Miracle Audition", Wakaba aspires to be an idol like Pure Palette. Her cute voice and sponge-like ability to take in new things are of note. A curious girl with abundant expressions, Wakaba is constantly fascinated by novelties and can perfectly copy something she's only seen once. She serves as the muse of her own brand, Humming Leaf.

A rookie idol who has just transferred to Star Harmony Academy. Bright and energetic, Raki is a hard-working girl who always looks forward. For some reason, she is very lucky, and often ends up getting good fortunes or winning lotteries. She loves fashion design and gets absorbed when it comes to dresses. Her goal is to create her own premium rare dress under her own brand, Maple Ribbon.

Honey Cat

Maika is a high school first year who belongs to Star Harmony Academy's idol division. A passionate girl who loves festivals, Maika has good reflexes and her specialty is her sharp dancing. She also enjoys popularity as a model, and serves as the muse of her favorite brand, Dancing Mirage. She formed the Friends Honey Cat with Ema Hinata.

Ema is a high school second year who belongs to Star Harmony Academy's idol division. A year older than Aine and the others, she is a reliable big sister figure who juggles lacrosse and being an idol. A great singer with an outstanding sense of rhythm, Ema formed the Friends Honey Cat with Maika Chono. She serves as the muse of her own brand, Colorful Shake.

Love Me Tear

Karen is one of the world-famous Friends, Love Me Tear. Born into the noble Kamishiro family, she received special education from a young age. Attentive and always smiling, she is an idol overflowing with love. She is currently traveling around the world in order to deliver love through her Aikatsu! Long ago, she was acquainted with Alicia, and hopes to help Alicia by giving her advice. She serves as the muse of her own brand, Classical Ange.

Mirai is one of the world-famous Friends, Love Me Tear. A fashion leader with a love for things that are "cunique", she often takes pictures and uploads them on Friendstagram. Using her experience as the designer and producer of her own brand, Milky Joker, Mirai is now focusing on nurturing new idols while active as an idol herself. She has a friendly rivalry with Hibiki, and they compete with each other every time they meet.

Reflect Moon

Sakuya is a high school first year who belongs to Star Harmony Academy. She formed the Friends Reflect Moon with her younger twin sister Kaguya. Although easygoing, Sakuya has a strong heart and a self-composed personality. She is spoiled by Kaguya, who often deals with her personal matters. She serves as the muse of her own brand, Luna Witch.

Kaguya is a high school first year who belongs to Star Harmony Academy. She formed the Friends Reflect Moon with her older twin sister Sakuya. After the Diamond Friends Cup, Kaguya came to take Aikatsu! seriously in order to become an idol fit to be Sakuya's Friends partner. She serves as the muse of her own brand, Moon Maiden.

I Believe

Hibiki is an Aikatsu! artist who suddenly appears before Aine and the others. Charismatic, mature, and stylish, she has a lot of charm to the point everyone immediately thinks of her as amazing. The same age as Love Me Tear, Hibiki is especially close with Mirai, with whom she has a friendly rivalry and competes with every time they meet. In the past, they even faced each other at the finals of the Diamond Friends Cup. That confrontation caused Hibiki's Friends to disband. She serves as the muse of her own brand, Heavenly Perfume.

Alicia is the idol with whom Hibiki formed Friends with and also Solvette's princess. A beautiful girl with a distinctive atmosphere, she unknowingly captivates those who see her. After facing Love Me Tear in the finals of the Diamond Friends Cup, Alicia stopped being Friends with Hibiki and suddenly disappeared. In truth, she was hiding a big secret... She serves as the muse of her own brand, Glorious Snow.

Baby Pirates

She serves as the muse of her own brand, Antique Sailor.

She serves as the muse of her own brand, Silky Ocean.

Other characters

Star Harmony Academy
 and

Family members

Yūki
 and 

Aine's parents who manage of Penguin Cafe.

Aine's elder sister.

Aine's elder brother.

Aine's younger sister who wants to be an idol when she grows up. Her catchphrase is 

Aine's younger brother and the youngest of the five Yūki children, who knows little about idols.

Minato 

A fashion designer who is Mio's mother. She designs the diamond dress for Pure Palette.

An industrial designer who is Mio's father.

Kiseki 

Sāya is Aikatsu engineer and the elder sister of Raki. When working, Sāya can get to an obsessive stage to a point where her words and actions are similar to that of an evil villain, but she deeply cares for her sister and fully supports her dreams in idol activities.

Chōno 

Maika's mother.

The owner of Chono Boxing Gym who is Maika's father.

Maika's elder brother.

Others

The Aikatsu! Navi girl. From information about idols, to coords, to simple questions, Coco teaches various things concerning Aikatsu!

A virtual iTuber who admires Coco and aims to be like her.

References

Aikatsu Friends